Grapevine Faith Christian School (GFCS) is a private Christian school in Grapevine, Texas, United States.

Athletics
GFCS participates as a member of TAPPS.  Their Athletic teams are nicknamed The Lions. In December 2016, the varsity Lions football team claimed the state TAPPS title.

One Heart Bowl
GFCS previously maintained a "rivalry" with the Gainesville State School, a Texas Juvenile Justice Department maximum-security juvenile detention facility.  (The "rivalry" was, from a competition standpoint, one-sided as FCS has won all of the matchups.)

The rivalry began when GFCS and Gainesville State were placed in the same district in 2008 for athletic competition.

After learning about how the Gainesville State program operated (the team plays all its games on the road, has no fan base outside of its coaches and the guards assigned to escort the team each week, and the roster – where players are identified only by their first name and first initial of their last name – is subject to significant turnover due to players being released from custody or removed from the team for disciplinary action), GFCS head football coach/athletic director Kris Hogan sent an unusual request to the team's fans – he asked them to form a spirit line and cheer for the Gainesville State players in their upcoming game.  The game made national headlines.

The teams played again in district competition in 2009 (now renamed "One Heart Bowl"); the game featured (then) Cowboys coach Wade Phillips in attendance.

Gainesville State and GFCS were moved into different districts in 2010; however, GFCS and Gainesville State continued the annual football game. until Gainesville State elected to play six-man football instead.

Notable Graduates
Seth G. A. Gertz-Billingsley, class of 2017. Billingsley attended university in Arkansas before working as an environmental lobbyist and attending Harvard Law School in Cambridge, Massachusetts. Prior to starting law school, Gertz-Billingsley worked as an environmental lobbyist in Austin, Texas where he led efforts to increase green infrastructure in the state.

References

External links

Faith Christian School Official site

Christian schools in Texas
Private high schools in Texas
High schools in Tarrant County, Texas